PUKfm 93.6 is a South African campus radio station based in Potchefstroom in the North West.
PUKfm 93.6 is the Liberty Radio Awards 2018 Campus Station of the Year.

Coverage areas 
North West University, Potchefstroom only

Broadcast languages
Afrikaans
English

Broadcast time
24/7

Target audience
Primarily students, secondary (scholars and young working adults)
LSM Groups 6–10
Age Group 16–25

Programme format
30% Talk
70% Music

Listenership Figures

References

External links
 Official Website
 SAARF Website

Student radio stations in South Africa
North-West University
Mass media in Potchefstroom